Hemorrhois ravergieri, commonly called the spotted whip snake, is a species of snake in the family Colubridae. The species is endemic to Western Asia, Central Asia, and South-Central Asia.

Etymology
The specific name, ravergieri, is in honor of a certain Mr. Ravergier who was an attaché at the French embassy in Saint Petersburg, Russia.

Geographic range
H. ravergieri is found in the following localities.
Greece: Kos
Middle East: Turkey, Iraq, Iran, Lebanon, Syria, Jordan, Israel

The former Soviet republics of the Caucasus and Central Asia, the latter from the eastern shore of the Caspian Sea east to E Kazakhstan:
Caucasus: parts of Russia, Armenia, Georgia, Azerbaijan
Central Asia: Kazakhstan, Turkmenistan, Uzbekistan, Tajikistan
South Asia: Afghanistan, Pakistan
East Asia: W Mongolia, NW China (Xinjiang)

Description
Dorsally, H. ravergieri is tan or grayish, with a series of dark rhomboidal spots or crossbars, alternating with smaller spots on the sides. The spots usually become confluent posteriorly, and appear as dark stripes on the tail. There is a diagonal dark streak below the eye, and a similar subparallel streak from the back of the eye to the corner of the mouth. Ventrally, it is whitish or covered with blackish dots.

The weakly keeled dorsal scales are arranged in 21 rows. The ventrals, which are obtusely angulate laterally, number 190-222; the anal is divided; and the subcaudals, which are paired, are 75-101.

References
 Citations

 Bibliography
Böhme W (1993). "Coluber ravergieri - Ravergiers Zornnatter ". In: Böhme W (editor) (1993). Handbuch der Reptilien und Amphibien Europas, Band 3/I., Schlangen (Serpentes) I. Wiesbaden: Aula-Verlag. pp. 145–154. (in German).
Ménétries E (1832). Catalogue raisonné des objets de zoologie recueillis dans un voyage au caucase et jusqu'aux frontières actuelles de la Perse. Saint Petersburg, Russia: L'Académie Impériale des Sciences. 330 pp. (Coluber ravergieri, new species, pp. 69–70). (in French).
Schätti B, Monsch P (2004). "Systematics and phylogenetic relationships of Whip snakes (Hierophis Fitzinger) and Zamenis andreana Werner 1917 (Reptilia: Squamata: Colubrinae)". Rev. Suisse Zool. 111 (2): 239–256.
Schweiger M (1991). "Coluber ravergieri Menetries, 1832 - eine ungewöhnliche Zornnatter. Teil 1: Beschreibung, Verbreitung, Ökologie und Giftwirkung ". Herpetofauna 13 (70): 30–34. (in German).

External links

Coluber ravergieri at The Checklist of Armenia's Amphibians and Reptiles at Tadevosyan's Herpetological Resources. Accessed 30 March 2007.

Colubrids
Reptiles of Pakistan
Reptiles of Afghanistan
Reptiles of Central Asia
Reptiles of Mongolia
Hemorrhois
Reptiles described in 1832
Snakes of Jordan